Interstate 95 (I-95) is a major north–south Interstate Highway that runs along the East Coast of the United States from Miami, Florida, north to the Canadian border in Houlton, Maine. In the state of Pennsylvania, it runs  from the Delaware state line near Marcus Hook in Delaware County northeast to the Delaware River–Turnpike Toll Bridge at the New Jersey state line near Bristol in Bucks County. 

From the Delaware state line north to exit 40, the route is known by many as the Delaware Expressway but is officially named the Vietnam Veterans Memorial Highway. North of exit 40, I-95 follows the easternmost portion of the Pennsylvania Turnpike; this portion of road is not signed as part of the turnpike. I-95 parallels its namesake Delaware River for its entire route through the city of Philadelphia and its suburbs. It is a major route through the city and the Delaware Valley metropolitan area, providing access to locally important landmarks such as Subaru Park, Philadelphia International Airport, the South Philadelphia Sports Complex, Penn's Landing, and Philadelphia Mills.

Plans for a limited-access route along the Delaware River in the Philadelphia area originated in the 1930s when both a parkway and elevated highway were proposed; neither of these were built. The Delaware Expressway was approved in 1945 as a toll road that was to be part of the Pennsylvania Turnpike system until the project was turned over to the Pennsylvania Department of Highways in 1956, with the expressway to be included in the Interstate Highway System as part of I-95. Construction on I-95 began in 1959 and was mostly complete by 1979, with the final portion near the Philadelphia International Airport finished in 1985. The route was originally projected to run through the center of Trenton, New Jersey, but was rerouted to the Scudder Falls Bridge to the north due to limited capacity in Trenton. I-95 remained on this alignment until 2018 when the route was truncated to the Pennsylvania Turnpike, being replaced by an extended I-295 north of there. Upon completion of two new high-speed flyovers connecting I-95 and the Pennsylvania Turnpike in 2018, I-95 was extended to the east into New Jersey toward the New Jersey Turnpike along the former I-276 (Pennsylvania Turnpike).

Route description

Delaware County 
I-95 enters Pennsylvania from Delaware in Lower Chichester Township, Delaware County, a short distance north of the southbound exit and northbound entrance with the northern terminus of I-495. The ramp from southbound I-95 to southbound I-495 splits immediately north of the state line. From the Delaware state line, I-95 heads northeast as the Delaware Expressway (Vietnam Veterans Memorial Highway), a six-lane freeway. The route runs through wooded areas, passing over Pennsylvania Route 491 (PA 491) without an interchange and coming to a northbound welcome center and weigh station. The road enters Upper Chichester Township and reaches a partial cloverleaf interchange with Chichester Avenue near the community of Boothwyn. Past this interchange, the freeway passes near residential areas and comes to the partial cloverleaf interchange at PA 452 to the north of the borough of Marcus Hook. I-95 continues east-northeast through woods and heads to the south of CSX Transportation's Twin Oaks Rail Yard, an automotive unloading facility. The road comes to an interchange with U.S. Route 322 (US 322) and Highland Avenue, with I-95 having a southbound exit and northbound entrance with US 322 and a complete interchange with Highland Avenue. At this point, US 322 becomes concurrent with I-95 and the roadway enters the city of Chester, gaining a fourth northbound lane and passing through urban residential neighborhoods. The freeway crosses into Chester Township and heads near more development in the community of Feltonville before US 322 splits from I-95 at a directional T interchange to head southeast on a freeway toward the Commodore Barry Bridge over the Delaware River. US 322 provides access from I-95 to the Chester Waterfront and Subaru Park, the home stadium of the Philadelphia Union of Major League Soccer.

From here, I-95 heads back into the city of Chester and runs between CSX Transportation's Philadelphia Subdivision railroad line to the northwest and urban areas to the southeast, coming to a northbound exit and southbound entrance with Kerlin Street. The freeway narrows to six lanes and continues closely parallel to the railroad tracks, crossing Chester Creek into the borough of Upland and passing to the southeast of Crozer-Chester Medical Center on the other side of the railroad. I-95 heads into Chester once again and comes to an interchange with PA 320 and PA 352 as it and the CSX Transportation rail line pass under several city streets. Following this, the freeway curves northeast near urban neighborhoods and crosses Ridley Creek into Ridley Township. Here, the roadway comes to a directional T interchange with the southern terminus of I-476 in the community of Woodlyn, where it also passes over Crum Creek. Past this interchange, I-95 widens to eight lanes and turns to the east away from the CSX Transportation line, passing near residential and commercial development and coming to bridges over US 13 without access and Amtrak's Northeast Corridor railroad line. The road curves east-northeast and enters the southern edge of the borough of Ridley Park, running to the north of Boeing Defense, Space & Security's Vertical Lift helicopter plant. The freeway heads back into Ridley Township as it reaches a diamond interchange with Stewart Avenue that serves Ridley Park. Past this interchange, the highway curves southeast before coming to a bridge over Darby Creek, at which point it enters Tinicum Township. I-95 turns to the east-northeast and passes between the creek to the north and commercial development to the south. The freeway comes to a cloverleaf interchange with PA 420 north of the community of Essington, where the right-most lanes in each direction serve as collector–distributor roads for the interchange. Past this interchange, the eight-lane freeway continues between marshland in the John Heinz National Wildlife Refuge at Tinicum to the north and developed areas to the south. I-95 heads north of an office park before it reaches a northbound ramp that connects to eastbound PA 291. Past this, the freeway comes to a bridge over Conrail Shared Assets Operations' (CSAO) Chester Secondary railroad line and PA 291 (Bartram Avenue).

Philadelphia County 

I-95 crosses into the city of Philadelphia in Philadelphia County, at which point it heads to the northwest of the Philadelphia International Airport. The freeway passes under a ramp to the airport's departures terminal and SEPTA's Airport Line as it comes to the northbound exit for the Philadelphia International Airport terminals and a southbound entrance from PA 291 (Bartram Avenue). The road crosses under a ramp to the airport's arrivals terminal and turns to the northeast, reaching a southbound entrance from the airport terminals. The freeway passes under the northbound ramp to the airport terminals and reaches a northbound exit to PA 291 and a southbound entrance from PA 291 as it crosses under the ramp from the airport terminals to southbound I-95. At this point, I-95 gains collector–distributor roads on each side, carrying a 3–3–3–3 lane configuration. The road comes to a southbound exit to the Philadelphia International Airport terminals and PA 291 (Bartram Avenue) and a northbound entrance from the airport terminals. The freeway passes over PA 291 (Island Avenue), where a ramp connects from northbound I-95 to PA 291 and from PA 291 to southbound I-95. I-95 turns east and the collector–distributor roads end, with the roadway becoming eight lanes wide. The road comes to a bridge over PA 291 (Penrose Avenue), where there is a ramp from southbound PA 291 to southbound I-95 and a southbound exit and northbound entrance serving Bartram and Essington avenues. From here, the freeway turns southeast and heads through industrial areas, coming to a southbound exit and northbound entrance with Enterprise and Island avenues, where it also passes over CSAO's 60th Street Industrial Track line. The road narrows to six lanes and curves to the northeast, crossing the Schuylkill River on the Girard Point Bridge, a double-decker cantilever truss bridge.

Past the Schuylkill River, I-95 continues east into South Philadelphia as an elevated freeway through industrial areas to the north of The Navy Yard, a mixed-use development that is located at the former Philadelphia Naval Shipyard. The road passes over CSX Transportation's Harrisburg Subdivision railroad line and heads between Franklin Delano Roosevelt Park to the north and the parallel railroad tracks and The Navy Yard to the south, coming to an interchange with the southern terminus of PA 611 at Broad Street. Past this interchange, the freeway runs between the South Philadelphia Sports Complex to the north and CSX Transportation's Greenwich Yard to the south. I-95 continues east past warehouses to the north and the railroad yard to the south before making a turn to the north, running to the west of CSAO's Swanson Street Industrial Track line and the Port of Philadelphia. The road comes to an interchange connecting to eastbound I-76 (Schuylkill Expressway), which leads to the Walt Whitman Bridge over the Delaware River, and Packer Avenue. The freeway passes under the Walt Whitman Bridge carrying I-76 at this interchange. Past this interchange, I-95 widens to eight lanes and becomes an elevated roadway, running between urban residential areas to the west and commercial areas to the east. Farther north, the freeway comes to an interchange connecting to Columbus Boulevard and Washington Avenue, where it briefly narrows to seven lanes, with three northbound lanes and four southbound lanes, and returns to ground level. Following this, I-95 becomes eight lanes again and passes through the eastern part of Center City. The freeway heads between the Old City neighborhood to the west and Penn's Landing along the Delaware River to the east, where it lowers to a depressed level and passes through two short tunnels. Along this stretch, the road crosses under several city streets including Walnut, Chestnut, and Market streets. I-95 passes under the Benjamin Franklin Bridge, which carries I-676/US 30 and the PATCO Speedline over the Delaware River, before it comes to an interchange connecting to I-676/US 30 (Vine Street Expressway) along with Callowhill Street.

North of Center City Philadelphia, SEPTA's Market–Frankford Line rises from the Market Street subway into I-95's median as the highway returns to an elevated alignment, with the SEPTA line entering Spring Garden station before diverging from the median of I-95. From here, I-95 curves to the northeast and passes near urban residential and commercial areas in the Fishtown neighborhood, coming to an interchange that serves Girard, Lehigh, and Delaware avenues. The freeway heads into the Port Richmond neighborhood and runs between development to the northwest and an empty lot along the Delaware River to the southeast, crossing over CSAO's Richmond Industrial Track line on a bridge. The road continues between residential areas to the northwest and industrial areas to the southeast as it reaches a full interchange at Allegheny Avenue and a northbound entrance from Castor Avenue. I-95 passes under railroad tracks carrying NJ Transit's Atlantic City Line and CSAO's Delair Branch and crosses Frankford Creek as it comes to a stack interchange serving the Betsy Ross Bridge, which crosses the Delaware River and connects to the Route 90 freeway in New Jersey, and Aramingo Avenue. From here, the freeway heads into Northeast Philadelphia, passing north of the Bridesburg neighborhood and reaching an interchange with Bridge Street and Harbison Avenue. The road curves to the east-northeast and runs near urban residential and industrial development, with Amtrak's Northeast Corridor becoming closely parallel with the road to the northwest. I-95 passes northwest of the Tacony–Palmyra Bridge over the Delaware River in the Tacony neighborhood and comes to an interchange with PA 73 (Cottman Avenue) and Rhawn Street, with PA 73 providing a connection to the Tacony–Palmyra Bridge. Past this interchange, the freeway heads further from the railroad tracks and runs through industrial areas in the Holmesburg neighborhood, passing over a CSAO railroad spur at Bleigh Avenue and crossing over the Pennypack Trail and the Pennypack Creek within Pennypack Park. The road closely parallels Amtrak's Northeast Corridor again as it runs near more commercial development. I-95 comes to a bridge over the Amtrak line and reaches an interchange with Academy Road and Linden Avenue. After this interchange, the freeway narrows to six lanes and passes between residential areas to the northwest and Amtrak's Northeast Corridor to the southeast.

Bucks County 

Upon crossing Poquessing Creek, I-95 enters Bensalem Township in Bucks County and continues northeast parallel to the Amtrak line past suburban residential areas and some commercial developemt in the community of Andalusia. The freeway comes to a trumpet interchange with the eastern terminus of PA 63, which heads northwest on the Woodhaven Road freeway into Northeast Philadelphia and provides access to the Philadelphia Mills shopping mall. Past this interchange, I-95 passes northwest of a park-and-ride lot at Cornwells Heights station on Amtrak's Northeast Corridor and SEPTA's Trenton Line, with a southbound exit and northbound entrance serving the park-and-ride lot at the train station. The road continues alongside the railroad tracks through developed suburban areas in the community of Cornwells Heights. I-95 reaches a diamond interchange with the eastern terminus of PA 132 at Street Road before the Amtrak line splits to the east and the highway comes to a bridge over US 13 with no access. The freeway passes near wooded residential neighborhoods before it crosses Neshaminy Creek, at which point it heads into Bristol Township.

Upon crossing into Bristol Township, I-95 comes to a directional T interchange with a short freeway stub connecting to PA 413 north of the borough of Bristol. From here, the freeway curves north and passes near industrial parks. I-95 reaches a partial interchange with the terminus of I-295, which continues north (east) along the Delaware Expressway, and the eastern terminus of I-276, which follows the Pennsylvania Turnpike. At this interchange, I-95 travels on flyover ramps to connect to the eastbound turnpike. This interchange has a northbound exit and southbound entrance with I-295 and a southbound exit and northbound entrance with I-276. Following this interchange, I-95 passes over PA 413 and heads east along the four-lane Pennsylvania Turnpike, although I-95 is not signed as part of the turnpike. The route runs through wooded areas with nearby development. Farther east, the road crosses Mill Creek and reaches a trumpet interchange connecting to US 13. Past this interchange, I-95 passes over an East Penn Railroad line and comes to the southbound all-electronic Delaware River Bridge toll gantry, where tolls can be paid with E-ZPass or toll by plate at highway speeds. From here, I-95 heads onto the Delaware River–Turnpike Toll Bridge, a through arch bridge, passing over US 13, the Delaware Canal, and Amtrak's Northeast Corridor before crossing the Delaware River. At this point, the Pennsylvania Turnpike ends and I-95 continues east (north) into New Jersey as the Pearl Harbor Memorial Extension of the New Jersey Turnpike, which connects to the mainline of the New Jersey Turnpike.

History 
Plans for a limited-access highway along the Delaware River originated in 1932 as part of a proposed cars-only parkway system for the Philadelphia area similar to the contemporary system being built in New York City. However, planning for the proposed parkway system stalled and the plan was eventually abandoned. In 1937, plans for the highway were revived as the "Delaware Skyway", a planned elevated highway along the waterfront similar in design to the West Side Highway in New York City, though these plans were also scrapped due to concerns that the supports would hinder access to port operations on the waterfront.

In 1945, the city approved the current routing as the Delaware Expressway, envisioned to link all the industrial areas along the river with the Industrial Highway and the Trenton–Morrisville Toll Bridge to New Jersey. The proposed highway was incorporated into the Pennsylvania Turnpike system and was planned to be built as a toll road. However, with the advent of the Interstate Highway System in 1956, the project was turned over to the Pennsylvania Department of Highways and incorporated into I-95. Construction on the road commenced in 1959.

Original plans called for the freeway to follow the US 13 corridor to the Trenton–Morrisville Toll Bridge, where I-95 would continue north along the current Trenton Freeway (US 1). However, due to limited capacity of the highway through Trenton, planners instead opted to build a new alignment bypassing Trenton to the west (current I-295), incorporating the existing Scudder Falls Bridge.

Controversy erupted in the early 1960s over the planned eight-lane elevated segment of the highway along the Center City waterfront; residents of the upscale Society Hill neighborhood objected to the highway on the grounds that it would cut off the neighborhood from the river. State highway officials reached a compromise by opting for an alternative depressed design with an overhead concrete deck connecting Center City to a planned redeveloped waterfront today known as Penn's Landing. By 1979, the entire length of the freeway was open to traffic with the exception of a  segment near Philadelphia International Airport.

Completion of the final section of the highway faced considerable difficulty, as the road was to be built on a layer of clay separating the city's water supply from the output of its sewage treatment plant. Matters were complicated by a two-year suspension of federal highway funding while the state failed to implement a federally mandated emissions testing program. The final segment was opened to traffic in 1985, marking the completion of the 35-year project.

As part of the construction of Terminal A-West complex at Philadelphia International Airport, new exit ramps were built connecting I-95 to the airport's passenger terminals. In July 1999, the Pennsylvania Department of Transportation (PennDOT) and several federal government agencies selected a route for the connecting ramps from I-95 to the airport; the agency tried to avoid the John Heinz National Wildlife Refuge at Tinicum. K/B Fund II, the owner of the International Plaza complex, formerly the Scott Paper Company headquarters Scott Plaza, objected to the proposed routing, saying it would interfere with International Plaza development. It entered a filing in the US Court of Appeals for the Third Circuit to challenge the proposed routing. In 2000, the airport attempted to acquire the complex for $90 million (equivalent to $ in ) but Tinicum Township commissioners stopped the deal from going forward, citing concerns of a loss of tax revenue for the township and Interboro School District as well as noise pollution concerns. In 2002, construction took place on new entrance ramps to the airport's passenger terminals. The new ramps eliminated the traffic signal and stop intersections previously encountered by northbound I-95 motorists who had to use PA 291 to the airport. The project also included new highway lighting, overhead sign structures, landscaping, and the paving of Bartram Avenue. Also under the project, PennDOT resurfaced I-95 between PA 420 and Island Avenue and built a truck enforcement and park-and-ride lot. A ribbon-cutting ceremony for the new ramps took place on June 28, 2002, with Governor Mark Schweiker in attendance. 

On March 18, 2008,  of I-95 within Philadelphia were closed when PennDOT discovered large cracks in a support column underneath the highway. In order to prevent possible collapse, I-95 was closed between exit 23 (Girard Avenue) and exit 25 (Allegheny Avenue). PennDOT worked quickly to stiffen the support beams to allow the road to be raised off the column, using 16 jacks, early on March 20. PennDOT reopened the road shortly thereafter, and planned to replace the cracked column.

Filling the I-95 gap

Prior to 2018, I-95 and the Pennsylvania Turnpike (I-276) crossed with no interchange. I-276 continued east along the turnpike to the Delaware River–Turnpike Toll Bridge and I-95 continued north to the Scudder Falls Bridge. In order to remedy this and also provide a continuous route for I-95, eliminating the gap in New Jersey caused by the cancellation of the Somerset Freeway, a high-speed interchange between the two roads was built. I-95 was rerouted onto the Pennsylvania Turnpike into New Jersey toward the New Jersey Turnpike, cutting the eastern terminus of I-276 back to the interchange, and I-295 was extended into Pennsylvania along the former I-95 alignment around Trenton to end at the interchange.

Groundbreaking for the interchange took place on July 30, 2013, with Governor Tom Corbett in attendance. Construction of the first stage of the interchange, consisting only of the two high-speed flyovers carrying I-95, began in late 2014. In preparation for completion of this stage, I-95 was truncated to the Taylorsville Road interchange in Lower Makefield Township in March 2018 and then truncated to the site of the interchange construction in July of the same year, with I-295 extended to replace I-95. On September 22, 2018, the flyovers opened. Signs were updated during a brief early-morning closure of the turnpike, marking the truncation of I-276 and Pennsylvania Turnpike signage to the new interchange, and the extension of I-95 eastward into New Jersey, forming a continuous posted route between Miami, Florida, and the Canadian border in Houlton, Maine. The completion of this interchange also provided a direct freeway connection between Philadelphia and New York City.

Control cities along I-95 were updated in early 2018 in preparation for the opening of the main flyovers. From as far south as I-676/US 30 in Center City, the previous northbound control city of Trenton was replaced with New York. This continues eastward as I-95's northbound control city into New Jersey. Trenton remains the control city of eastbound I-295 (former northbound I-95) until US 1, after which it becomes Princeton.

The remaining six interchange movements have yet to begin construction due to funding constraints. Construction will begin when funding is available.

Future

95revive project 
PennDOT is currently in the process of completely reconstructing I-95 between I-676/US 30 and PA 73 (Cottman Avenue) in Philadelphia. This section, built in the 1960s, was nominally eight lanes but narrowed to six lanes at most interchanges. PennDOT has split the project into five individual projects or sections, starting at the interchange at PA 73 (Cottman Avenue) and ending at the Girard Avenue interchange.

Cottman/Princeton interchange to Levick Street
Phase One, with construction costing $34 million (equivalent to $ in ) and lasting from April 2009 to September 2012, involved construction of a new southbound onramp from State Road at Longshore Avenue, as well as a northbound onramp from Milnor Street to an existing northbound onramp from Princeton Avenue. PA 73 (Cottman Avenue) and State Road were widened, and Princeton Avenue was converted from a one-way eastbound street to a two-way street.

Phase Two, with construction costing $212.3 million (equivalent to $ in ) and lasting from November 2012 to 2017, involved reconstruction of seven bridges between Bleigh Avenue and Levick Street along I-95. New retaining walls next to I-95 and a new water main and sewer culvert along Wissinoming Street were built.

Phase Three will begin in 2021 and end around 2023 and will include the construction of a new ramp from PA 73 (Cottman Avenue) onto I-95 southbound, an associated retaining wall, and the relocation of Wissinoming Street between Princeton Avenue and Wellington Street. The cost is unknown.

Levick Street to Bridge Street interchange
This project, split into four phases, involves reconstructing I-95 and its bridges to provide four lanes each way from the Levick Street overpass to the Bridge Street interchange, along with the extension of Delaware Avenue from Buckius Street to Tacony Street.

Bridge Street interchange to Betsy Ross Bridge interchange

This project, split into six phases, will include widening and reconstructing I-95 and its bridges from Wheatsheaf Lane through the Betsy Ross Bridge interchange to Margaret Street. The first phase was completed in late 2017, with construction starting in March 2015, at a cost of $160.3 million (equivalent to $ in ); it included widening ramps and constructing new ramps involving I-95, Aramingo Avenue, and the Betsy Ross Bridge. The second phase started at January 2017 and is expected to be completed in 2020 at a cost of $81 million; this involved building new ramps from Aramingo Avenue to I-95 and opening the ramps from Aramingo Avenue to and from the Betsy Ross Bridge.

Ann Street to Frankford Creek
This project, split into four phases, includes reconstructing I-95 from the Betsy Ross Bridge to the Allegheny Avenue ramps and improving the interchange at Allegheny Avenue/Castor Avenue. Already, Richmond Street was widened and had new curbs, sidewalks, and traffic signals installed and trees planted, which, along with other improvements, cost $32.1 million.

Girard Avenue interchange to Allegheny/Castor interchange
This project, including seven phases, includes reconstructing I-95 between the Girard Avenue interchange through the Allegheny Avenue/Castor Avenue interchange to the I-676/US 30 interchange at Race Street. I-95 between Palmer Street and Frankford Avenue has already been rebuilt and improved upon, and an I-95 viaduct between Palmer and Ann streets has been rebuilt. 

In addition to reconfiguring the interchanges, the road will be widened, resulting in I-95 being at least eight lanes wide between I-676/US 30 and Academy Road. The entire project's tentative completion date is around 2026.

Relocation in Philadelphia 
Some have proposed removing the freeway, thereby allowing Philadelphians better access to the Delaware River. On December 31, 2015, Philadelphia Mayor Michael Nutter announced that a $10-million (equivalent to $ in ) study funded by state and federal money would consider placing I-95 in a tunnel in the area around Penn's Landing.

The park is expected to have spray pools, a skating rink, and a cafe. The park is to slope down to the riverfront, expanding the Penn's Landing promenade and connecting it to Old City. The project is expected to be completed in 2026.

Exit list

See also

References

External links 

 The Roads of Metro Philadelphia: Delaware Expressway (I-95)
 Pennsylvania Highways: Interstate 95
 I-95 at AARoads.com
 Pennsylvania Roads - I-95

 Pennsylvania
95
Transportation in Philadelphia
Transportation in Bucks County, Pennsylvania
Transportation in Delaware County, Pennsylvania
Toll roads in Pennsylvania